Karl Daxbacher (born 15 April 1953) is an Austrian football manager and a former player.

Private 
Daxbacher was born in St. Pölten, Austria, in 1953. He has four daughters.

Playing career

Daxbacher started his career at the ASV Statzendorf (close to St. Pölten) at the age of 15. After having played for Kremser SC for one season, he switched to FK Austria Wien in 1971. During the next 14 years he played about 400 national, and 40 international games for this team, as well as 6 games for the Austria national football team. In 1985, he switched to Kremser SC again (in the second highest division), where he ended his active career in 1986.

Coaching career

Daxbacher has been working as a coach for SV Horn, SKN St. Pölten, FK Austria Wien  II, LASK Linz, and Austria Wien.

Austria Wien hired Daxbacher for the 2008–09 season and sacked him on 22 December 2011. Austria Wien had one league win in their last nine league matches at the time of the sacking.

On 12 June 2012, he returned to LASK Linz. He was sacked on 16 March 2015. He had won two of his last eight matches and lost one of his last six. Martin Hiden was named interim head coach.

Coaching record

Honours

As player
 Austrian champion: 7 times (all with FK Austria Wien).
 Austrian Cup winner: 4 times (all with FK Austria Wien).
 UEFA Cup Winners' Cup finalist: 1 time (FK Austria Wien).

As manager
 Austrian Regional League East winner (3rd highest division): 1 time (FK Austria Wien  II).
 Austrian Football First League winner (2nd highest division): 3 times (LASK Linz, SKN St. Pölten, Wacker Innsbruck ).
 Austrian Cup winner: 1 time (FK Austria Wien).

References

External links
 Profile at the FK Austria Wien homepage 
 

1953 births
Living people
Austrian footballers
Austria international footballers
Austrian football managers
FK Austria Wien players
LASK managers
FK Austria Wien managers
SKN St. Pölten managers
FC Wacker Innsbruck (2002) managers
Association football midfielders
SV Horn managers
People from Sankt Pölten
Footballers from Lower Austria